Joël Roland (born 24 September 1944) is a Belgian sailor. He competed in the Flying Dutchman event at the 1968 Summer Olympics.

References

External links
 

1944 births
Living people
Belgian male sailors (sport)
Olympic sailors of Belgium
Sailors at the 1968 Summer Olympics – Flying Dutchman
People from Ixelles
Sportspeople from Brussels